Lady of the Night is the debut studio album by American singer-songwriter Donna Summer, released on February 26, 1974. The album, which was produced by Pete Bellotte, was released only in The Netherlands, and spawned the minor hit singles "The Hostage" and "Lady of the Night" in that country. The songs, written by the Moroder/Bellotte team, are mostly of the pop/rock/folk variety. The track "Lady of the Night" is popular in Germany, receiving air time on radio stations that feature classics of the sixties and seventies. Being formerly married to an Austrian, Donna Summer was a fluent German speaker and recorded a number of songs in that language.

"Full of Emptiness" was excised from all CD reissues, as the track was re-mixed and re-released on her next album, 1975's Love to Love You Baby.

"Little Miss Fit" had been previously released as a single on the Ariola label in The Netherlands and Germany by Dutch singer Debbie in 1973.

Track listing

References

External links
Lady of the Night at Discogs

1974 debut albums
Donna Summer albums
Albums produced by Pete Bellotte
Casablanca Records albums